This article lists feature-length films and full-length documentaries that were at least partly produced by the Bangladeshi film industry and were released in Bangladesh in 2018. Short films and made-for-TV films are not included. Films are ordered by domestic public release date, excluding film festivals, theatrical releases abroad, and sneak previews or screenings.

Inspector Notty K, starring Jeet and Nusrat Fariha, started out as an Indo-Bangla joint production by Jeetz Filmworks and Jaaz Multimedia. Late in shooting, the rules for joint productions changed. Rather than delay the release until a required preview committee was formed, the producers released it as an Indian film, which Jazz Multimedia then imported to Bangladesh. It was released in India on 19 January 2018. Originally intended to release simultaneously in Bangladesh, it was delayed there by one week to 26 January.

Releases

January–March

April–June

July–September

October-December

See also

 2018 in Bangladesh

References

Film
Lists of 2018 films by country or language
 2018